This is a list of personnel changes from the 1946–47 BAA season.

Trades

Selling

External links
NBA Transactions at NBA.com
1946-47 NBA Transactions| Basketball-Reference.com

References
https://www.basketball-reference.com/leagues/BAA_1947_transactions.html

Transactions
1946-47